Ploticus is a free, open-source (GPL) computer program for producing plots and charts from data.  It runs under Unix, Solaris, Mac OS X, Linux and Win32 systems. Community support is customarily done through Yahoo News Groups.

History
The first version was released August 25, 1999. Ploticus is a mature product with activity, where the last major release (2.42) occurred in May 2013. Bruce Byfield in Linux.com described Ploticus as, "...a throwback to the days when Unix programs did one thing, and did it well, using a minimum of system resources."

Graph types and features
At the center of Ploticus lies a scripting language. Through the scripting language, "2-D graphs and... basic statistical functions" are supported. Sophisticated graphs can be developed quickly using scripts previously developed, called "prefabs". Simple graphs can be produced using few parameters in addition to the data. Users can create and modify "prefabs".

Ploticus supports the following types of plot: line plots, filled line plots, category line plots, ranges sweeps, pie graphs, vertical bar graphs, horizontal bar charts, timelines, floating bar segments, bar proportions, scatter plots, heat maps (density grids), single variable distribution, error bars, curve fitting, vector plots, Venn diagrams, Venn magnitude charts, tree diagrams. Features include: scaling and axes, legends, annotations, clickmap, and mouse-over support.

Applications
Ploticus has been used for:
 Animal Phenome Graphing 
 Climate Trending
 Health Data Analysis

As a plug-in
Ploticus can be used as a plug-in with various other software such as:
 Semantic MediaWiki
 Asterisk PBX GUI Client

See also

 List of graphing software

References

External links
 

Free plotting software
Free statistical software
Plotting software
Free software programmed in C
1999 software